Jacob Ewane (born 11 February 1967) is a Cameroonian former international footballer who played as a midfielder.

References

1967 births
Living people
Footballers from Douala
Cameroonian footballers
Cameroon international footballers
Canon Yaoundé players
R.E. Mouscron players
K.S.K. Ronse players
Challenger Pro League players
Association football midfielders
Cameroonian expatriate footballers
Cameroonian expatriate sportspeople in Belgium
Expatriate footballers in Belgium
1992 African Cup of Nations players